Out of the Forrest is an album by saxophonist Jimmy Forrest recorded in 1961 and released on the Prestige label.

Reception

Allmusic awarded the album 4 stars stating "His highly expressive powers and ability to say a lot with a few notes is very much in evidence on this excellent set".

Track listing 
All compositions by Jimmy Forrest except as indicated
 "Bolo Blues" - 4:07  
 "I Cried for You" (Gus Arnheim, Arthur Freed, Abe Lyman) - 5:03  
 "I've Got a Right to Cry" (Joe Liggins) - 4:22  
 "This Can't Be Love" (Lorenz Hart, Richard Rodgers) - 4:03  
 "By the River Sainte Marie" (Edgar Leslie, Harry Warren) - 5:13  
 "Yesterdays" (Otto Harbach, Jerome Kern) - 5:08  
 "Crash Program" (Forrest, Johnson) - 4:02  
 "That's All" (Alan Brandt, Bob Haymes) - 4:54

Personnel 
Jimmy Forrest - tenor saxophone
Joe Zawinul - piano
Tommy Potter - bass
Clarence Johnston - drums

Production
Esmond Edwards - supervisor
Rudy Van Gelder - engineer

References 

Jimmy Forrest albums
1961 albums
Prestige Records albums
Albums recorded at Van Gelder Studio
Albums produced by Esmond Edwards